Barbara Herzog (born 28 December 1985, in Vienna) is an Austrian former ice dancer. Skating with David Vincour, she won two Austrian national junior titles (2000–2001). She then teamed with Dmytro Matsyuk and won three senior national titles (2002–2004).

Programs

With Matsyuk

With Vincour

Competitive highlights 
JGP: Junior Grand Prix

With Matsyuk

With Vincour

References

External links

Navigation

Austrian female ice dancers
1985 births
Living people
Figure skaters from Vienna